Joël Beaujouan (born 11 October 1948) is a retired French football goalkeeper and later manager.

References

1948 births
Living people
French footballers
Racing Besançon players
Valenciennes FC players
Le Mans FC players
Amiens SC players
Ligue 1 players
Ligue 2 players
Association football goalkeepers
French football managers
Le Havre AC managers
Ligue 1 managers
Ligue 2 managers
French expatriate footballers
Expatriate footballers in the United Arab Emirates
French expatriate sportspeople in the United Arab Emirates
French expatriate sportspeople in Bahrain